Rawa Mazowiecka Castle (Polish: Zamek w Rawie Mazowieckiej) is a Gothic architectural style square formation castle located in Rawa Mazowiecka, in the lowlands of the river Rawka and the river Rylka. Currently it is a renovated ruin.

According to the scriptures of Jan Długosz, the castle was built by Casimir III the Great, and the stronghold's function was to protect the southern borders of Masovia. Although reconstruction efforts have been raised by Franciszek Lanckoroński, the reconstruction was stopped, most likely due to the Partitions of Poland, after which the Prussian authorities ordered to deconstruct the ruins, only keeping the tower. The rest of the brick material was used for nearby housing. Currently the renovated tower is open to tourists, and the outline of the castle's former square formation has been reconstructed around the tower.

References

Castles in Łódź Voivodeship
Rawa County